The Abbot of Arbroath or Abbot of Aberbrothok (and later Commendator) was the head of the Tironensian Benedictine monastic community of Arbroath Abbey, Angus, Scotland, founded under the patronage of King William of Scotland from Kelso Abbey and dedicated to St Thomas of Canterbury, Thomas Becket. The abbot, John Gedy, was granted the mitre on 26 June 1396.  Arbroath Abbey became the wealthiest and most powerful abbey in later medieval Scotland.

According to the poem "The Inchcape Rock" by Robert Southey, John Gedy, then Abbot of Aberbrothok, fixed a bell to the inchcape rock in the 1300s to warn mariners of the perilous rock.

The following is a list of abbots and commendators.

Reginald, 1178–79
Henry, 1179–1207
Gilbert, 1208–19 x 1229
Radulf de Lamley, 1225–39
Adam, 1240–46
Walter, 1247–58 x
Robert, 1261–67
Sabinus, 1267 ?
John, 1268–70
William, 1276–84
Henry, 1285–96
Nicholas, 1296 x 99-1301
John de Anegus, 1303–09
Bernard, 1310–28
Geoffrey, 1329–47
William, 1348–66
John, 1370–84
John Gedy, 1384–1410
Walter Paniter, 1410–49
Robert Bowmaker, 1419
Richard Guthrie, 1449–55
Malcolm Brydy, 1456–70
Richard Guthrie, 1470–12
Hugh Douglas, 1470
Francis Gonzaga, 1472
Alexander Scrymgeour, 1472
Patrick Graham, 1473–76
George Boyce, 1472–82
William Bonkil, 1482–84
David Lichton, 1484–1503
James Stewart, 1503–04
George Hepburn, 1504–13
Gavin Douglas, 1514
Andrew Forman, 1514
James Stewart, 1514–17
Peter de Accoltis, 1517
James Beaton, 1517–23 x 1524
David Beaton, 1524–45
James Beaton II, 1545–51
George Douglas, 1546
John, Lord Hamilton 1551–68
George Douglas, (again) 1568–72, became Bishop of Moray
John, Lord Hamilton (again), 1573–79
Esmé Stuart, 1579–83

Notes

References
 Cowan, Ian B. & Easson, David E., Medieval Religious Houses: Scotland With an Appendix on the Houses in the Isle of Man, Second Edition, (London, 1976)
 Summerson, Henry, "Gedy, John (fl. 1370–1401?)", Oxford Dictionary of National Biography, Oxford University Press, 2004, accessed 27 Jan 2009
 Watt, D. E .R. & Shead, N. F. (eds.), The Heads of Religious Houses in Scotland from the 12th to the 16th Centuries (The Scottish Records Society, New Series, Volume 24), (Edinburgh, 2001)

Arbroath
Abbot of Arbroath